Craig Wederquist (born  October 26, 1960) is a former American football coach. He served as head football coach at Tarleton State University in Stephenville, Texas from 1997 to 1999.  Wederquist played college football as an offensive tackle at Drake University. He was selected by Michigan Panthers of the United States Football League (USFL) in the seventh round of the 1983 USFL Draft with the 83rd overall pick.  He signed with the new club, was placed on injured reserve during the team's inaugural season, and retired in 1984.

Wederquist worked as the defensive coordinator at the University of the Pacific before the Tigers dropped football after the 1995 season. After one season as defensive coordinator at Tarleton State, Wederquist replaced Todd Whitten as head coach. Wederquist is currently teaching at Saydel High School in Saylorville, Iowa.

References

1960 births
Living people
American football defensive linemen
Central Missouri Mules football coaches
Colorado State Rams football coaches
Drake Bulldogs football coaches
Drake Bulldogs football players
Graceland Yellowjackets football coaches
Iowa Wesleyan Tigers football coaches
Pacific Tigers football coaches
Tarleton State Texans football coaches
UNLV Rebels football coaches
Utah State Aggies football coaches
High school football coaches in Iowa